The  or  (Dutch), meaning "Mint Square", is a major square in central Brussels, Belgium. The Royal Theatre of La Monnaie, home to the National Opera of Belgium, is located on this square. It is served by the metro and premetro (underground tram) station De Brouckère on lines 1, 3, 4 and 5.

History

Early history
The Place de la Monnaie takes its name from an old coinage workshop or mint, erected inside the former Hôtel Ostrevant, which, from the 14th to the 16th centuries, occupied most of the current square. The name of this site—La Monnaie (originally spelled La Monnoye) in French or De Munt in Dutch (both meaning "The Mint")—remained attached to the square for the centuries to come.

The Hôtel Ostrevant was replaced in 1551–1565 by a funnel-shaped square, the eastern side of which was first occupied by the city's first full-fledged / ("Minting Hall"). This building was decommissioned in 1649 and replaced in 1700 by a theatre, known as the Grand Opera, by the Italian architect and treasurer of Maximilian II Emanuel, Elector of Bavaria, Gio Paolo Bombarda. Bombarda established his theatre on this site in order to take advantage of the large empty space left after the bombardment of Brussels of 1695. Around that time, it was decided to create a large square all around this theatre in order to highlight it; this was the embryo of the Place de la Monnaie. Bombarda's theatre was itself demolished in 1820 to allow the development of a new theatre and square, after a project conceived in 1817–1822 by the French architect Louis Damesme.

On the western side of the square, a new mint, built in 1649, then rebuilt and extended in 1755, gave way in 1820 to another mint designed in neoclassical style by the architect .

On that occasion, the square was fitted out in the "above-ground" style of the time with the addition of numerous benches, planters and fountains spread out over its entirety.

Redevelopment (2010–2013)
The square was completely redeveloped between 2010 and 2012 by the architect Benoît Moritz. The plan was to make the urban space more pleasant by freeing it from the elements which encumbered it; to highlight the monuments flanking it, in particular the Royal Theatre of La Monnaie; as well as to promote its use for entertainment, festivities, or daily use. To do this, significant basement work was carried out: the entire covering was repaved in blue stone with alternating finishes. The theatre and the square were delimited by new contemporary lights arranged in a broken line, and the two kiosks located at the ends of the square were redesigned. In 2013, Muntpunt; a Dutch-language public library built in 1973 at the corner of the Place de la Monnaie and the /, was also enlarged and revamped.

Location and accessibility
The Place de la Monnaie is one of the most central public spaces in Brussels, located on one of the busiest pedestrian axes in Europe, not far from the Place de Brouckère/De Brouckèreplein and the Boulevard Anspach/Anspachlaan. Its western side lines up with the / and the Rue Neuve/Nieuwstraat (one of the main commercial streets in Belgium), and on its eastern side, the Royal Theatre of La Monnaie is surrounded on three sides by the / to its north, the / to its east, and the / to its south.

Buildings around the square

Royal Theatre of La Monnaie

The most important building on the Place de la Monnaie is the Royal Theatre of La Monnaie, located on its eastern side. It was designed by Louis Damesme and erected between 1817 and 1822 to replace the Grand Opera built in 1700 by Gio Paolo Bombarda. It is from this theatre that the Belgian Revolution started in 1830, after a performance of Auber's opera La Muette de Portici. After a fire on 21 January 1855, the theatre was reconstructed after the designs of Joseph Poelaert. The theater has been renovated many times. The last renovation dates from 1986 and was carried out by the architectural offices A.2.RC and URBAT, as well as the architect Charles Vandenhove. Today, it is home of the National Opera of Belgium, one of the foremost opera houses in Europe.

Monnaie Center
On the western side of the square is the Monnaie Center, which has replaced the Grand Postal Office since 1971. This  building houses the Mint Gallery; a covered shopping gallery, as well as the administrative services of the City of Brussels, and provides access to the metro and to four underground parking levels. To its left, another covered shopping gallery; the Anspach Gallery, opens onto the square.

See also

 Central Boulevards of Brussels
 Neoclassical architecture in Belgium
 History of Brussels
 Belgium in "the long nineteenth century"

References

Notes

Bibliography
 
 
 
 
 

Squares in Brussels
City of Brussels
19th century in Brussels
Car-free zones in Europe
Odonyms referring to a building